Geovibrio thiophilus is a Gram-negative, non-spore-forming and sulfur-reducing bacterium from the genus of Geovibrio which has been isolated from a drainage ditch in Konstanz in Germany.

References

Deferribacterota
Bacteria described in 2002